Cemetery Girl is a novel written by David Bell, which was released by New
American Library, a member of Penguin Group USA in 2011.

Novel
The novel tells the story of Tom and Abby Stuart, a couple who had everything:
a perfect marriage, successful careers, and a beautiful twelve-year-old daughter,
Caitlin. Then one day Caitlin vanished without a trace. For a while they grasped
at every false hope and followed every empty lead, but the tragedy ended up
changing their lives, overwhelming them with guilt and dread, and shattering their
marriage.

Four years later, Caitlin is found alive—dirty and disheveled yet preternaturally
calm. She won’t discuss where she was or what happened. Then the police
arrest a suspect connected to the disappearance, but Caitlin refuses to testify,
leaving the Stuarts with a choice: Let the man who may be responsible for
destroying their lives walk away, or take matters into their own hands. And when
Tom decides to try to uncover the truth for himself, he finds that nothing that has
happened yet can prepare him for what he is about to discover.

Reception
Publishers Weekly called Cemetery Girl “disquieting and suspenseful”  and Suspense Magazine called it “brilliantly engaging, and a must-read for thriller fans.” The Washington Post criticized Bell's novel because "his characters keep behaving in maddeningly irrational ways."

Cemetery Girl won the prestigious Prix Polar International de Cognac in 2013 and was a finalist for the 2012 Kentucky Literary Award.

The novel also received the most write-in votes when The New York Times asked readers what book should have won the Pulitzer Prize in fiction.

Cemetery Girl book trailer
Nashville filmmaker James Weems shot a short film called “Caitlin’s Story”  that serves as
the book trailer for Bell’s Cemetery Girl.

References

External links
 Cemetery Girl on YouTube
 Cemetery Girl at Penguin USA

2011 American novels
American thriller novels
New American Library books